Austrophaea is a monotypic genus of African corinnid sac spiders containing the single species, Austrophaea zebra. It was first described by R. F. Lawrence in 1952, and has only been found in South Africa.

References

Endemic fauna of South Africa
Corinnidae
Monotypic Araneomorphae genera
Spiders of South Africa